Railway stations in Haryana, India, are under jurisdiction of three Northern Railway zones i.e. Northern Railway zone, North Western Railway zone & North Central Railway zone . There are railway stations in the state of Haryana.

References

Railway stations in Haryana
Haryana
Northern Railway zone
North Western Railway zone
Haryana-related lists